FJS may refer to:

 Fallskärmsjägarskolan (FJS), the Swedish Parachute Ranger School
 French Japanese Society for fine and medicinal chemistry 
 Fajar Secondary School (FJS), in Bukit Panjang, Singapore
 FJ-S Cruiser Concept, a concept version of the Toyota FJ Cruiser
 FJS-1, a type of lunar regolith simulant
 FJS, airline code for Florida Jet Service
 Federación Juvenil Socialista (FJS), Chilean socialist party joined by revolutionary Miguel Enríquez
 Federación de Juventudes Socialistas (FJS), one of the original parties consolidated into the Communist Party of Spain
 Franz Josef Strauss, West German politician (1915-1988)

See also
FJ (disambiguation)